Unbeatable Harold is a 2006 romantic comedy film directed by Ari Palitz and starring Gordon Michaels, Nicole DeHuff, Henry Winkler, Gladys Knight, Charles Durning, Taryn Manning, Phyllis Diller, Lourdes Benedicto and Dylan McDermott. Based on a play by Randy Noojin, an earlier version of the film was originally shown at film festivals in 2006: at the ISIS theater in Aspen in March 2006, at the HBO Comedy Festival and at the Waterfront Film Festival in Saugatuck, Michigan.   In 2008, new scenes were filmed and added, and the film was completely re-edited. A new score composed by Mike Reagan was also added. It was released theatrically in June 2009 in North America.

The movie was released on DVD on February 23, 2010.

This film also marks Nicole DeHuff's final film appearance, before she died in 2005 from pneumonia.  Her husband, Ari Palitz, directed the film.

References

External links 

2006 films
2006 romantic comedy films
American romantic comedy films
British romantic comedy films
2000s English-language films
2000s American films
2000s British films